Oxyepoecus daguerrei is a species of ant in the genus Oxyepoecus. It is native to Argentina.

References

Myrmicinae
Endemic fauna of Argentina
Hymenoptera of South America
Insects described in 1933
Taxonomy articles created by Polbot